The Fallen may refer to:

Arts, entertainment, and media

Fictional entities
 The Fallen (comics), character in Marvel Comics
 The Fallen (Transformers), a Transformers comic book and movie character

Film and television 
 The Fallen (1926 film), a German silent film
 The Fallen (2004 film), a 2004 film about World War II
 The Fallen (Arrow), an episode of Arrow

Games
 Star Trek: Deep Space Nine: The Fallen, a 2000 video game
 The Fallen, also known as Eliksni, are a race in Destiny and Destiny 2.

Literature
Series
 The Fallen (series), a series of novels authored by Thomas E. Sniegoski

Books
 The Fallen (Higson novel), book 5 in Charlie Higson's young adult horror series, The Enemy
 The Fallen, a novel by Stephen Finucan
 The Fallen (2016), a futuristic Christian novel by Robert Don Hughes, published by Venture Press 
 The Fallen, a novel by T. Jefferson Parker

Poetry
For the Fallen, by Laurence Binyon, often recited at Remembrance Day services.

Music
Groups
 We Are the Fallen, a band consisting of several former Evanescence members
Songs
 "The Fallen", a 2006 song by the rock band Franz Ferdinand
 "The Fallen", a song by the metal band Suicide Silence

See also
 Fallen (disambiguation)